Jorge Enrique Ampuero Cabello (born 17 April 1987) is a Chilean footballer who last played for Chilean Segunda División side Rodelindo Román.

Career
He is commonly known for having played at Unión Española.

In 2021, he played for Chilean Segunda División side Rodelindo Román,

Personal life
Since 2021, Ampuero and his father have a construction company called Constructora Sagrada Familia (Holy Family Construction). At the same time he played for Rodelindo Román, he worked in the construction field.

Honours

Player
Unión Española
 Primera División (1): 2013 Transición
 Supercopa de Chile (1): 2013

Santiago Wanderers
 Primera B (1): 2019

Ñublense
 Primera B (1): 2020

References

External links
 Profile at BDFA 
 

1987 births
Living people
Footballers from Santiago
Chilean footballers
Unión Española footballers
Deportes Melipilla footballers
Unión La Calera footballers
Santiago Wanderers footballers
Ñublense footballers
Rodelindo Román footballers
Chilean Primera División players
Primera B de Chile players
Segunda División Profesional de Chile players
Association football defenders
21st-century Chilean people